Platyderus is a genus of ground beetles in the family Carabidae. There are more than 100 described species in Platyderus.

Platyderus species
These 109 species belong to Platyderus, a genus of ground beetles in the family Carabidae.

 Platyderus akkus Jedlicka, 1963  (Turkey)
 Platyderus algesiranus Dieck, 1870  (Spain)
 Platyderus alhamillensis Cobos, 1961  (Spain)
 Platyderus alticola Wollaston, 1864  (the Canary Islands)
 Platyderus anandi J.Schmidt, 2009  (Nepal)
 Platyderus anatolicus Jedlicka, 1963  (Turkey)
 Platyderus aragonicus Jeanne, 1985  (Spain)
 Platyderus asturiensis Jedlicka, 1958  (Spain)
 Platyderus atticus Apfelbeck, 1904  (Croatia and Greece)
 Platyderus balearicus Jeanne, 1970  (Baleares and Spain)
 Platyderus barrosi Jeanne, 1996  (Portugal)
 Platyderus barsevskisi Anichtchenko, 2010  (Spain)
 Platyderus berlovorum Anichtchenko, 2005  (Spain)
 Platyderus beseanus Jeanne, 1970  (Portugal)
 Platyderus bolivari Anichtchenko, 2011  (Spain)
 Platyderus breuili Jeannel, 1921  (Spain)
 Platyderus calathoides (Dejean, 1828)  (Algeria and Morocco)
 Platyderus canaliculatus (Chaudoir, 1843)  (Italy and Sicily)
 Platyderus casalei B.Gueorguiev, 2009  (Italy)
 Platyderus caucasicus Kryzhanovskij, 1968  (Georgia and Russia)
 Platyderus chodjaii Morvan, 1974  (Iran)
 Platyderus claudejeannei Machard, 2017  (Morocco)
 Platyderus coiffaiti Jeanne, 1996  (Portugal and Spain)
 Platyderus corcyreus Breit, 1914  (Greece)
 Platyderus crypticola Jeanne, 1996  (Spain)
 Platyderus cyprius Piochard de la Brûlerie, 1876  (Cyprus)
 Platyderus cyrtensis Reiche, 1872  (Algeria and Tunisia)
 Platyderus dalmatinus L.Miller in Reitter, 1881  ((former) Yugoslavia, Albania, Bosnia-Herzegovina, Croatia, and Italy)
 Platyderus davatchii Morvan, 1970  (Iran)
 Platyderus dejeani Jeanne, 1996  (Spain)
 Platyderus depressus (Audinet-Serville, 1821)  (worldwide)
 Platyderus dertosensis Lagar Mascaro, 1964  (Spain)
 Platyderus elegans Bedel, 1900  (Tunisia)
 Platyderus ellipticus Bedel, 1902  (Algeria and Morocco)
 Platyderus emblema Marseul, 1871  (Spain)
 Platyderus espanoli Mateu, 1952  (Spain)
 Platyderus ferrantei Reitter, 1909  (Egypt)
 Platyderus filicornis Bedel, 1902  (Algeria)
 Platyderus formenterae Jeanne, 1988  (Baleares and Spain)
 Platyderus foveipennis (Casale, 1988)  (Kyrgyzstan)
 Platyderus gallaecus Jeanne, 1970  (Spain)
 Platyderus gazureki Anichtchenko, 2011  (Spain)
 Platyderus graecus (Reiche & Saulcy, 1855)  (Albania and Greece)
 Platyderus grandiceps Piochard de la Brûlerie, 1876  (Israel, Lebanon, and Syria)
 Platyderus gregarius Reiche, 1862  (Algeria, the Canary Islands, Morocco, Portugal, and Spain)
 Platyderus haberhaueri Heyden, 1889  (Tadzhikistan and Uzbekistan)
 Platyderus incertans Mateu, 1952  (Spain)
 Platyderus insignitus Bedel, 1902  (Morocco)
 Platyderus itziarae Anichtchenko, 2005  (Spain)
 Platyderus jeannei Zaballos, 1990  (Spain)
 Platyderus jedlickai Maran, 1935  (Greece)
 Platyderus juncoi Jeanne, 1996  (Spain)
 Platyderus lancerottensis Israelson, 1990  (the Canary Islands)
 Platyderus languidus (Reiche & Saulcy, 1855)  (Egypt, Israel, Libya, Morocco, and Syria)
 Platyderus ledouxi Morvan, 1974  (Iran)
 Platyderus lencinai Anichtchenko, 2011  (Spain)
 Platyderus leonensis Jeanne, 1996  (Spain)
 Platyderus lombardii Straneo, 1959  (Italy and Sicily)
 Platyderus lusitanicus (Dejean, 1828)  (Portugal and Spain)
 Platyderus magrinii Degiovanni, 2005  (Italy)
 Platyderus majoricus Jeanne, 1988  (Baleares and Spain)
 Platyderus marianicus Ruiz-Tapiador & Anichtchenko, 2007  (Spain)
 Platyderus mateui Anichtchenko, 2005  (Spain)
 Platyderus migelangeli Anichtchenko, 2005  (Spain)
 Platyderus minutus (Reiche & Saulcy, 1855)  (Albania, Greece, and North Macedonia)
 Platyderus moncayensis Jeanne, 1985  (Spain)
 Platyderus montanellus Graells, 1851  (Spain)
 Platyderus namrun Jedlicka, 1963  (Turkey)
 Platyderus neapolitanus (Reiche, 1855)  (Italy)
 Platyderus notatus (Coquerel, 1859)  (Algeria and Tunisia)
 Platyderus ortunoi Arribas, 1992  (Spain)
 Platyderus otini Antoine, 1941  (Morocco)
 Platyderus paganettii B.Gueorguiev, 2009  (Italy)
 Platyderus portalegrae Vuillefroy, 1868  (Portugal)
 Platyderus preciosae Campos & Novoa, 2005  (Portugal and Spain)
 Platyderus punctiger (Reiche & Saulcy, 1855)  (Israel, Syria, and Turkey)
 Platyderus pyrenaeus Tempère, 1947  (France and Spain)
 Platyderus quadricollis Chaudoir, 1866  (Spain)
 Platyderus quezeli Bruneau de Miré, 1990  (Chad)
 Platyderus reticulatus (Chaudoir, 1842)  (Iran and Turkey)
 Platyderus robustoides Jeanne, 1996  (Spain)
 Platyderus robustus Mateu, 1952  (Spain)
 Platyderus rotundatus Chaudoir, 1866  (Spain)
 Platyderus rufus (Duftschmid, 1812)  (worldwide)
 Platyderus saezi Vuillefroy, 1868  (Portugal and Spain)
 Platyderus sagrensis Anichtchenko, 2005  (Spain)
 Platyderus salmantinus Jeanne, 1996  (Spain)
 Platyderus schrammi Anichtchenko, 2012  (Spain)
 Platyderus schuberti Jedlicka, 1963  (Turkey)
 Platyderus sinensis Casale & Sciaky, 2003  (China)
 Platyderus skoupyi Jeanne, 1996  (Spain)
 Platyderus solissimus (Antoine, 1939)  (Morocco)
 Platyderus speleus Cobos, 1961  (Spain)
 Platyderus subcrenatus Chaudoir, 1866  (Spain)
 Platyderus tadzhikistanus Kryzhanovskij, 1968  (Tadzhikistan)
 Platyderus taghizadehi Morvan, 1974  (Iran)
 Platyderus talyschensis Reitter, 1887  (Azerbaijan)
 Platyderus testaceus (Rambur, 1838)  (Spain)
 Platyderus toribioi Anichtchenko, 2005  (Spain)
 Platyderus torressalai Jeanne, 1996  (Spain)
 Platyderus troglodytes L.Schaufuss, 1863  (Spain)
 Platyderus umbratus (Ménétriés, 1832)  (Armenia, Azerbaijan, Georgia, and Russia)
 Platyderus valencianus Anichtchenko, 2005  (Spain)
 Platyderus varians L.Schaufuss, 1862  (Spain)
 Platyderus vignai B.Gueorguiev, 2009  (Italy)
 Platyderus vuillefroyi Dieck, 1870  (Spain)
 Platyderus weiratheri Maran, 1940  (Turkey)
 Platyderus zaballosi Anichtchenko, 2011  (Spain)
 Platyderus zagrosensis Morvan, 1975  (Iran)

References